The Amours of Sainfroid and Eulalia or Venus in the Cloister is a pornographic book published in New York City in 1854, translated from the French Les Amours de Sainfroit, jésuite, et Eulalie, fille dévote published by Isaac van der Kloot at The Hague in 1729. It is an anticlerical account of the seduction of a nun by a Jesuit priest.  Henry Spencer Ashbee suggests that it is based on an historical incident in Toulon in 1728–29, involving Jesuit priest 
 and alleged witch Catherine Cadière.

See also

Venus in the Cloister (1683, tr.1724)

References
Pisanus Fraxi (Henry Spencer Ashbee), Index Librorum Prohibitorum: being Notes Bio- Biblio- Icono- graphical and Critical, on Curious and Uncommon Books, London, privately printed, 1877, pp. 64–70
Clare A. Lyons, Sex among the Rabble: an intimate history of gender & power in the age of revolution, Philadelphia, 1730-1830, Omohundro Institute of Early American History and Culture, UNC Press, 2006, p. 131

Pornographic novels
French erotic novels
18th-century French novels
1729 novels